The 2015 IS Open de Tênis was a professional tennis tournament played on clay courts. It was resumed after not being held in 2014, being the third edition of the tournament which was part of the 2015 ATP Challenger Tour. It took place in São Paulo, Brazil, on 22–28 October 2015.

Singles entrants

Seeds

 1 Rankings as of 5 October 2015

Other entrants
The following players received wildcards into the singles main draw:
  Thiago Monteiro
  Orlando Luz
  Pedro Sakamoto
  Marcelo Zormann

The following players received entry from the qualifying draw:
  Joris De Loore
  João Menezes
  André Miele
  Carlos Eduardo Severino

The following players entered as lucky losers:
  Ricardo Hocevar
  João Pedro Sorgi

Doubles entrants

Seeds

1 Rankings as of 13 October 2015

Other entrants
The following pairs received wildcards into the doubles main draw:
  Igor Marcondes /  João Menezes
  Thiago Monteiro /  Pedro Sakamoto
  Felipe Carvalho /  Rodrigo Carvalho

The following pairs entered as an alternate:
  Carlos Eduardo Severino /  João Pedro Sorgi

The following pairs entered using a protected ranking:
  Gastão Elias /  Pedro Sousa

Champions

Singles

  Carlos Berlocq def.  Kimmer Coppejans 6–3, 6–1

Doubles

  Hans Podlipnik /  Caio Zampieri def.  Nicolás Kicker /  Renzo Olivo 7–5, 6–0

External links
Official website

2015 ATP Challenger Tour
2015
2015 in Brazilian tennis